Ado or ADO may refer to:

People 
 Ado (fl. 1550), Akwamuhene ruler of the Akan people 
 Ado (footballer) (born 1947), Brazilian footballer
 Ado (Lagos Oba), 1st Oba of Lagos
 Ado (monk), monk of Goguryeo
 Ado (singer) (born 2002), Japanese singer
 Ado of Vienne (died 874), Frankish archbishop of Vienne
 Ado Anderkopp (1894–1941), Estonian politician, journalist and sport personality
 Ado Birk (1883–1942), Estonian politician
 Ado Campeol (1927/1928–2021), Italian restaurateur
 Ado Grenzstein (1849-1916), Estonian journalist
 Ado Johanson (1874–1932), Estonian politician
 Ado Kraemer (1898–1972), German chess master and problemist
 Ado Kurvits (1897–1958), Estonian Communist politician
 Igor Dmitrievich Ado (1910–1983), Russian mathematician
 Ado Onaiwu (born 1995), Japanese footballer 
 Ado Rõõmussaar (1891–1970), Estonian politician
 Ado Vabbe (1892-1961), Estonian painter, graphics artist and teacher
 Short form of Adnan (name), commonly used in Bosnia

Other uses 
ADO (band), a Chinese rock band
Ado Ekiti, a city in Nigeria
Ado-Odo, an ancient town in Ogun State, Nigeria
ADO Den Haag, a football club in the Netherlands
ADO.NET, a Microsoft database API
Ado's theorem, a theorem in abstract algebra
ActiveX Data Objects, a Microsoft API
Adenosine, a nucleoside
Adjora language (ISO 639-3: ado), a Ramu language of Papua New Guinea
Air Do (ICAO:ADO), a Japanese airline
Amalgamated Drawing Office, the design and engineering department of the British Motor Corporation (1952–1968)
Ampex Digital Optics, a digital video effects system
Andamooka Airport (IATA: ADO), South Australia
Assistant District Officer, a subsidiary rank to a District Officer in current and former territories with a British colonial model of administration.
Assistant divisional officer, a former rank in British fire brigades
Assyrian Democratic Organization, a political organization in Syria
Australian Defence Organisation, the Australian Defence Force and the Australian Department of Defense
Autobuses de Oriente, a passenger bus service in Mexico
"Ado", slang for the Roman Catholic practice of eucharistic adoration

Estonian masculine given names